The General Staff is the commanding and managing organisation of the Vietnam People's Army, the paramilitary forces, militia and other activities relating to defence of Vietnam. The General Staff was established on 7 September 1945, right after the Proclamation of Independence of the Democratic Republic of Vietnam, the first Chief of the General Staff was General Hoàng Văn Thái. During the Second Indochina War, Vietnam War, Cambodian-Vietnamese War, Sino-Vietnamese War and other skirmishes, the General Staff always had an essential role in organising, commanding the armed forces and planning, operating military campaigns for the Ministry of Defence and the Government of Vietnam. The current Chief of the General Staff is Senior Lieutenant General (AKA Colonel General) Nguyễn Tân Cương who also holds the position of Deputy Minister of Defence.

History and roles
Right after the August Revolution and the foundation of the Democratic Republic of Vietnam on 2 September 1945, the General Staff was established on 7 September 1945. The first Chief of the General Staff was Major General Hoàng Văn Thái who held the position from 1945 to 1953. During the existence of the General Headquarters of the Vietnam People's Army (Bộ Tổng tư lệnh Quân đội Nhân dân Việt Nam), which had been the supreme commanding organ of the armed forces from 1946 to 1975, the General Staff was directly under the General Headquarters and acted as staff of the General Headquarters according to the decree No. 47/SL which was issued on 1 May 1947.

After the Vietnam War, the General Headquarters was dissolved and the General Staff began to operate under the Ministry of Defence in the position of commanding and managing organisation of the Vietnam People's Army, the paramilitary forces, militia and other activities relating to defence of Vietnam. From 1978, the Chief of Staff was also Deputy Minister of Defence and would take the position of acting minister during the absence of the Minister of Defence.

Structure

The organisation of the General Staff consists of:
 Office of the General Staff (Văn phòng Bộ Tổng tham mưu)
 Department of Political Affairs (Cục Chính trị)
 Department of Operations (Cục Tác chiến)
 Department of Personnel (Cục Quân lực)
 Department of Military Intelligence (Cục Tình báo)
 Department of Information Technology (Cục Công nghệ thông tin)
 Department of Electronic Warfare (Cục Tác chiến điện tử)
 Department of Military Political Training and Public Affairs (Cục Quân huấn). This is also the office responsible for the sport activities of the Army including the operation of the Viettel FC (Thể Công) football club.
 Department of Cartography (Cục Bản đồ)
 Department of Cryptography (Cục Cơ yếu)
 Department of Logistics (Cục Hậu cần)
 Department of Military Education (Cục Nhà trường)
 Department of Militias and Reserve Forces (Cục Dân quân tự vệ)
 Department of Disaster Response and SAR (Cục Cứu hộ cứu nạn)

In addition, the General Staff also directly manages the operation of the 144th Brigade (which protects the Ministry of Defence headquarters), the Military Honour Guard Battalion (Đoàn Nghi lễ quân đội), and several companies and project management authorities.

Chief of the General Staff

The Chief of the General Staff (Vietnamese: Tổng tham mưu trưởng) is the chief of staff of the General Staff of the People's Army of Vietnam. He is appointed by the President of Vietnam, who is the Commander-in-Chief.

References

References

 

People's Army of Vietnam
Military units and formations established in 1945